Tourism accounts for a large part of El Salvador's economy. El Salvador has many natural attractions including beaches with some of the best surfing breaks on the Pacific Coast. El Salvador offers many lush forests shrouded in cool temperatures with abundant wildlife and scenic mountain-top vistas. El Salvador also has great potential in the field of cultural tourism; with over 2,000 known archaeological sites, mostly of the Maya and Olmec cultures. These sites are of international interest for their easy access and well preserved remains.

While tourism has become increasingly important to the Salvadoran economy it has experienced periods of boom and bust cycles that are largely attributed to the nation's safety or lack thereof. El Salvador has a high level of violent crime, this level has declined heavily in recent years leading to more foreign investment in tourist infrastructure.

One important feature of tourism in El Salvador is the relative small size of the nation.  Almost all tourist attractions are within forty miles from the capital.  That being said, a lack of good roads can make forty miles seem a lot longer.

Volume of tourism 

In 1994, 181,000 tourists visited El Salvador, generating 28.8 million dollars in tourism revenue. Three years later, a specialized governing body was created called Salvadoran Tourism Corporation (Corporación Salvadoreña de Turismo) (Corsatur), and in 1997 387,000 tourists visited, generating 74.7 million dollars.

Since then, tourism has seen a significant increase over previous years. In 2004, tourism injected $424.7 million into the economy. It also created the Ministry of Tourism to direct the policy of the development of the sector. To promote the momentum of this activity, during 2005 has developed the Tourism Act (Ley del Turismo), which provides tax incentives for new investments in the sector.

In 2008, 1.8 million tourists visited the country, generating for the economy about $720 million, according to the Ministry of Tourism.

The growth has not been based on attracting resort tourism, but rather in spurring investment in local businesses and Salvadorans living in US returning to their country.

Tourism contributed $855.5 million to El Salvador's GDP in 2013. This represented 3.5% of the total GDP.

Tourism directly supported 80,500 jobs in 2013. This represented 3.1% of total employment in El Salvador. In 2013, tourism indirectly supported 210,000 jobs, representing 8.1% of total employment in El Salvador.

It was estimated that 1,394,000 international tourists would visit El Salvador in 2014.

Despite advances, it is still behind of other established tourist destinations such as Costa Rica and Guatemala.

The lack of promotion abroad and adequate infrastructure to host international tourism are some of the most cited problems. The pros are the substantial improvement of road infrastructure, the remodeling of El Salvador International Airport in Comalapa, southeast of San Salvador. 

The airport serving international flights in El Salvador is Comalapa International Airport.

Historical Monuments

National Palace

The government of Captain General Gerardo Barrios created the idea of a National Palace, whose construction was carried out in 1866 to 1870, by Don Idelfonso Marín and José Dolores Melara, however, on 19 November 1889 a fire reduced it to rubble.

The current National Palace was designed by the engineer José Emilio Alcaine and constructed from 1905 to 1911 under the direction of José María Peralta Lagos, Don Pascasio González served as foreman, and construction materials were imported from Germany, Belgium, Italy and other countries.

On 13 December 1974, by legislative decree 165, it declared a national monument the Blue Room (Salón Azul) and the adjacent rooms and 10 July 1980, the Revolutionary Council of the Government, by Decree No. 116, declares the National Palace as "National Monument". It has four main halls in colors red, blue, yellow, pink, and 101 other rooms.

The Monument of Christopher Columbus and Queen Isabella
Both monuments are located side of the entrance of the main gate of the National Palace on Cuscatlán Avenue. They were unveiled on 12 October 1924 to place the 432º anniversary of the discovery of America. Both monuments were donated to the Salvadoran people by the King of Spain, Alfonso XIII, and officially handed over to the Government of El Salvador, during the administration of President Dr. Alfonso Quiñónez Molina.

Casa de las Academias
The former Casa Dueñas, owned of Dueñas family, was unoccupied for years. Then, in 1930 and 1933 was leased by the Legation of Mexico (at that time were not Embassies). From 1935 to 1957 the Legation of the United States rented the house for residence of the plenipotentiary ministers. And they lived there six American representatives diplomats, with occasional guests such as former presidents Richard Nixon and Lyndon B. Johnson and Senator Robert F. Kennedy and film artists Clark Gable and Tony Curtis.

Beaches

El Salvador also has plentiful sunlight and beaches. Some of the areas most visited by tourists are those of La Libertad, in the central region of the country. There are a number of beaches and a variety of hotels and restaurants.

Beaches like El Tunco or El Sunzal are used for surfing. Some Europeans and Americans have visited for the Salvadoran waves, ranked among the best in the world for surfing.. The Jiquilisco Bay located in the Usulután, is one of the most heavenly attractions in the country for its natural diversity.

Environmental aspects

However, in recent decades, biodiversity and ecological balance of the country have suffered due to the harsh impacts of urban planning and pollution. The increasing population concentration in urban areas has led to an increased bonding of the population in the South and Southwest regions of the country (especially in the Metropolitan Area of San Salvador). These areas are a fragile ecosystem, because they channel and feed the aquifers of the southern corridor of the country, limiting the flow of water from underground sources.

The main causes of pollution in El Salvador are mainly transportation, industry, controlled burning, and garbage incineration (about half of the garbage collected in the metropolitan area of San Salvador is not recycled). Furthermore, the vast majority of households use firewood for cooking.

El Salvador must work to create, in cooperation with the other neighboring countries, a healthy and sustainable biosphere that maintains endangered species.

Lately, El Salvador has had a significant growth in the field of renewable energy, specifically with hydroelectric and geothermal power, as organizations and the government are working to conserve and reforest the country.

Ecotourism

El Salvador has a range of greatly important national parks, both for their quantity and their uniqueness. The most important ecological areas are, among others:
 The National Nature Reservation Forest El Impossible
 The Cerro Verde National Park
 Montecristo National Park
 The Conchagua Volcano National Park
 The Walter T. Deininger Park
 The Jocotal Lake
 The Forest of San Diego
 El Forest of Nancuchiname

The Impossible Forest (Spanish: El Imposible) is located south of the department of Ahuachapán, on the mountain range of Apaneca, and covers an area of 3,130 hectares. It is highly inaccessible, to which it owes its name, and offers shelter to many animal species (insects, birds, mammals, and reptiles) and native vegetation, including the Siete Camisas Rojo (Guapira Witsbereri) and Amarante Silvestre ( Parathesis Congesta), two tree species unknown to science until recently.

From Cerro Verde National Park, located in the department of Santa Ana, the Izalco volcano can be seen, as well as the Santa Ana volcano and Lake Coatepeque. In this area, there are more than 127 species of birds and other animals. 

Montecristo National Park, located north of the department of Santa Ana, comprises one of the last cloud forests of El Salvador, consisting of oaks, pines, and cypresses, where it finds its habitat howler monkeys, black shrews, anteaters, white-tailed deer, and pumas.

Another exceptional faunal refuge constitutes Walter T. Deininger Park, where the hunting ban has led to the population of coyotes, deer, tucanoan, and iguanas. Waterfowl such as tree ducks, red-beaked redfish, and charancuacos are found in Jocotal Lake.

The Trifinio is one of the great forests, which shares its extension with Guatemala and Honduras - rivers, and above all, its villages, where much of the Salvadoran culture and traditional lifestyle is still present.

Archaeological sites

El Salvador also has exceptional potential in the field of cultural tourism, with over 2,000 known archaeological sites, and samples of Maya and Olmec cultures, mainly. They stand out for their importance the archaeological remains of the Pyramids of San Andrés, Joya de Cerén, Cihuatán, Quelepa, Tazumal and Tehuacán.

The Tazumal is located in Chalchuapa, Santa Ana Department where it was built by a culture still not defined as shares Mayoid elements of the Guatemalan highlands and the valley of Copán in the early Classic period (around 260). It made many changes over the centuries in the end it became a splendid place showing the great culture of El Salvador. The Kazuma remained independent after the fall of Copán and the arrival of the Pipes.

Tourist Routes
The El Salvador Ministry of Tourism has established eight tourist routes.

The last route in established was the "Route of the Volcanoes", which was created in 2009.

8 Tourist Routes are:

 Archaeological Route
Joya de Cerén, San Andrés, Santa Ana, Chalchuapa, Tazumal, Casa Blanca.

  Crafts Route
Ilobasco, Suchitoto, San Sebastián, Cihuatán, Colima, La Palma, San Ignacio, El Pital, Las Pilas, Miramundo, Citalá, Iglesia del Pilar.

 Route of La Paz
Perquín, Cacaopera, Arambala, Corinto, San Fernando.

  Route of the Thousand Peaks
Chaguantique Forest, Jiquilisco Bay, Tecapa Volcano and Alegría Lake, Berlín, Alegría.

  Rural and Cultural Route
Concepción de Ataco, Nahuizalco, Ilobasco, La Palma San Sebastián, Cihuatán, Joya de Cerén, San Andrés, Santa Ana, Chalchuapa, Tazumal, Casa Blanca, Iglesia Santiago Apóstol, Suchitoto, Panchimalco.

 Sun and Beach Route
Beaches of El Salvador:

 Central Zone: Palmarcito Beach, El Sunzal, El Tunco, La Paz, San Diego, Costa del Sol and Estero de Jaltepeque, and El Zonte.
 West Zone: la Barra de Santiago Beaach, Metalío, Los Cóbanos,
 Eastern Zone: Jiquilisco Bay, El Espino Beach, El cuco, Las Flores, Las Tunas, Torola, Playas Negras, El Tamarindo and the Fonseca Gulf.
 Route of Las Flores
Salcoatitán , Nahuizalco, Juayúa, Apaneca and Concepción de Ataco.

 Route of the Volcanoes
Cerro Verde, Izalco and Santa Ana.

See also

 Salvadoran cuisine
 Crime in El Salvador
 Mara Salvatrucha
 Culture of El Salvador

References

External links
 
 El Salvador Tourism info. 

 
El Salvador